is the remains of a castle structure in Wake, Okayama Prefecture, Japan. Its ruins have been protected as a Prefectural Historic Sites. The castle was bulit by Uragami Munekage.

Munekage expanded his territory base in the castle. But in 1575, Tenjinyama castle was attacked by Ukita Naoie who was former senior vassal of Munekage and Munekage escaped to Harima.

References

Castles in Okayama Prefecture
Historic Sites of Japan
Former castles in Japan
Ruined castles in Japan
Ukita clan